Ainderby railway station was a railway station serving the villages of Ainderby Steeple and Morton-on-Swale in North Yorkshire, England.

History
Opened by the York, Newcastle and Berwick Railway,  it became part of the London and North Eastern Railway during the Grouping of 1923. The line then passed on to the Eastern Region of British Railways on nationalisation in 1948. It was then closed by British Railways when the Northallerton to Hawes service was withdrawn in April 1954.

The site today
Track still passes through the station site, providing rail access for the Wensleydale Railway which operates west from Leeming Bar.  The line also sees occasional train loads of military equipment heading to or from Catterick Garrison via Redmire - these are operated by freight company DB Cargo UK on behalf of the Ministry of Defence.

Ainderby has been closed since 1954 however the Wensleydale Railway plans to reopen this station (as part of the extension to Northallerton).  The former station house (like several others along the route) has survived demolition and is used as a private residence.

References

 
 
 
 Station on navigable O.S. map

Disused railway stations in North Yorkshire
Railway stations in Great Britain opened in 1848
Railway stations in Great Britain closed in 1954
Former North Eastern Railway (UK) stations